Savannah King,  (born June 4, 1992) is a competition swimmer from Canada, who competes primarily in the freestyle events.  She claimed a bronze medal in the 800-metre freestyle at the 2007 Pan American Games in Rio de Janeiro, Brazil.  She also won a silver medal in the 4x200-metre freestyle relay by participating in the preliminary heats.

She made her Olympic debut at the 2008 Summer Olympics in Beijing, China.  In the 2009 Canadian Spring Nationals in Toronto, King broke the Canadian national records in both the 800-metre freestyle and the 1500-metre freestyle in a 25-metre short course pool with times of 8:19.99 and 16:00.68 respectively.  That summer she swam at the 2009 World Aquatics Championships in Rome, Italy, with a best placing of 20th in the 400-metre freestyle.  Most recently, King broke the Canadian record and CIS record in the 400-metre freestyle at the 2012 CIS Championships in Montreal with a time of 4:02.76.  At the 2012 Olympic Trials in Montreal, Savannah qualified for the 400-meter  freestyle with a second-place finish (4:07:02), swimming under the Canadian record time held by Brittney Reimer. Savannah also won the 800-metre free (8:30:79) coming well under the FINA A standard.  Her objective at the trials was to qualify for two individual distance events at the London 2012 Olympics.

She currently trains at the University of British Columbia in Vancouver, British Columbia.

References
Canadian Olympic Committee Profile

1992 births
Living people
Canadian female freestyle swimmers
Olympic swimmers of Canada
Sportspeople from Scarborough, Toronto
Swimmers at the 2007 Pan American Games
Swimmers at the 2008 Summer Olympics
Swimmers at the 2012 Summer Olympics
Swimmers from Toronto
UBC Thunderbirds swimmers
Pan American Games silver medalists for Canada
Pan American Games bronze medalists for Canada
Pan American Games medalists in swimming
Universiade bronze medalists for Canada
Universiade medalists in swimming
Medalists at the 2013 Summer Universiade
Medalists at the 2007 Pan American Games
21st-century Canadian women